The 2015 African-American Film Critics Association Awards were announced on December 7, 2015, while the ceremony took place on February 10, 2016 at Taglyan Complex, in Hollywood, California.

Awards
Below is the list of complete winners.

AAFCA Top Ten Films
 Straight Outta Compton (Universal Pictures)
 Creed (Warner Bros.)
 Mad Max: Fury Road (Warner Bros.)
 Beasts of No Nation (Netflix)  
 The Martian (20th Century Fox)
 3 1/2 Minutes and Dope (HBO Films/Open Road Films)  
 Chi-Raq (Roadside Attractions/Amazon Studios)
 Carol  (Weinstein Co.)
 The Big Short (Paramount Pictures)
 The Danish Girl (Focus Features)

AAFCA Regular Awards
 Best Picture
 Straight Outta Compton

 Best Director
 Ryan Coogler – Creed

 Best Actor
 Will Smith – Concussion

 Best Actress
 Teyonah Parris – Chi-Raq

 Best Supporting Actor
 Jason Mitchell – Straight Outta Compton

 Best Supporting Actress
 Tessa Thompson – Creed

 Best Ensemble
 Straight Outta Compton

 Best Independent Film
 Chi-Raq

 Best Screenplay
 Rick Famuyiwa – Dope

 Breakout Performance
 Michael B. Jordan – Creed

 Best Animation
 The Peanuts Movie

 Best Documentary
 A Ballerina's Tale

 Best Song
 "See You Again" – Furious 7

 Best TV Comedy
 Black-ish

 Best TV Drama
 How to Get Away with Murder

 Best Cable/New Media TV Show
 Survivor's Remorse

AAFCA Special Awards

 AAFCA Special Achievement Award
  Jeff Clanagan; John Singleton - Codeblack Entertainment and Maverick Carter; LeBron James - SpringHill Entertainment 
 Cinema Vanguard Award
 HBO 
 Roger Ebert Award
 Manohla Dargis - The New York Times film critic and journalist.

See also
2015 in film

References

African-American Film Critics Association Awards
2015 film awards